Ips sexdentatus is a species of weevil in the beetle family Curculionidae. It is found in Europe.

References

Scolytinae
Articles created by Qbugbot
Beetles described in 1776